Tom Hatherley Pear (22 March 1886 – 14 May 1972) was a British psychologist.  He was the first professor of psychology in England. He was president of the British Psychological Society.

Biography
Tom Hatherley Pear was born in Walpole, Norfolk, 22 March 1886 the oldest son of Alfred John and Mary Ann Pear. He undertook tertiary education and gained an M.A and B.Sc.

Career 
Pear became Professor of Psychology in the University of Manchester, Fellow of King's College London and president of the British Psychological Society. He was the author of several books on psychology including studies of human conversation, and the development of memory and skills. He was also Secretary of the Manchester Literary and Philosophical Society from 1920 to 1922.

Pear was actively involved in the system of assisting refugees and the family home became a safe house during the Kindertransport.  Many of those who passed through on their way to the US or who stayed in the UK became long term family friends.  A professor from Utrecht was found a lecturing post at Manchester University, before he too went to the US.

During WWI Pear, who had just returned from studying in Würzburg, became a Conscientious Objector, and served at Maghull Hospital, examining and then treating what was then known as 'Shell Shock', then 'Battle Psychosis', and is now acknowledged as PTSD. He was in regular correspondence with, and visited W. H. R. Rivers at Craiglockhart War Hospital in Edinburgh, where Siegfried Sassoon and Wilfred Owen were patients.

In 1917 Pear and co-author the Australian-born anatomist Grafton Elliot Smith show had worked with Ronald Rows at Maghull Military Hospita, proposed in  Shell-Shock and its Lessons the idea that ordinary people could benefit from techniques used in treating the soldiers: ‘If the lessons of war are to be truly beneficial, much more extensive application must be made of these methods, not only for our soldiers now, but also for our civilian population for all time.’

Personal life 
Pear was married to Catherine, who had a special interest in working-class housing in Manchester where they lived with their young family They had two daughters and two sons; Richard, born 1916, political scientist and Professor of American Politics at Nottingham University; and Brian, who was killed in the Second World War when as a flail tank commander, he led the attack on his sector of the beach on D-Day and was killed in action later that year on the Meuse, when he interposed his tank between a damaged one and enemy fire to permit the crew of the former to escape. Daughters were Marjorie who was a very talented pianist and harpsichord player and married a barrister who rose to High Court Judge, and Stella, who married a GP, and served for several decades as a Magistrate on the Bench Adult and Juvenile, in Grimsby and latterly in Bradford. 

Prof. Emeritus Pear died on 14 May 1972.

Publications

Books 

 Pear, T. H. (1931). Voice and personality as applied to radio broadcasting. New York: John Wiley & Sons.

 Pear, T. H. (1935). Mental imagery and style in writing. Place of publication not identified.
 Pear, T. H., & John Rylands Library, Manchester. (1937). The place of imagery in mental processes. Manchester: Manchester University Press.

 Pear, T. H. (1948). The Relations between Psychology and Sociology ... Reprinted from the "Bulletin of the John Rylands Library," etc. Manchester.

Articles 
 Pear, T. H. (January 01, 1942) 'Are there human instincts?,' Bulletin of the John Rylands Library, 27, 137-167.
 Pear, T. H. (January 01, 1938) 'The modern study of personality,' Bulletin of the John Rylands Library, 22, 517-538.
 Pear, T. H. (January 01, 1944) 'The concept of mental maturity. Bulletin of the John Rylands Library, 28, 404-421.
 Pear, T. H. (January 01, 1942)  'Psychoanalysis and normal psychology,' Bulletin of the John Rylands Library, 26, 158-182.
 Pear, T. H. (January 01, 1942)  'Psychological aspects of English social stratification,' Bulletin of the John Rylands Library, 26, 342-368.
 Pear, T. H. (January 01, 1945)  'Psychological implications of the culture-pattern theory,' Bulletin of the John Rylands Library, 29, 201-224.
 Pear, T. H. (January 01, 1946)  'Personality in its cultural context,' Bulletin of the John Rylands Library, 30, 71-90.
 Pear, T. H. (January 01, 1948) 'The relations between psychology and sociology,' Bulletin of the John Rylands Library, 31, 277-294.
 Pear, T. H. (January 01, 1948)  'Peace, war and culture-patterns,' Bulletin of the John Rylands Library, 31, 120-147.

Lectures and broadcasts 
 Pear, T. H., & British Broadcasting Corporation. (1930). 'Making work worth while'. London: British Broadcasting Corp.
 Pear, T. H. (1937)  transcription of 'Religion and contemporary psychology,' delivered before the University of Durham at Armstrong college, Newcastle-upon-Tyne, in November 1936. London: Oxford University Press, H. Milford.

References 

1886 births
1972 deaths
Presidents of the British Psychological Society
People from Walpole, Norfolk
Manchester Literary and Philosophical Society